
Gmina Krzeszów is a rural gmina (administrative district) in Nisko County, Subcarpathian Voivodeship, in south-eastern Poland.

Villages
Gmina Krzeszów contains the villages and settlements of Bystre, Kamionka, Koziarnia, Krzeszów, Krzeszów Dolny, Kustrawa, Łazów, Podolszynka Ordynacka, Podolszynka Plebańska and Sigiełki.

Neighbouring gminas
Gmina Krzeszów is bordered by the gminas of Harasiuki, Kuryłówka, Leżajsk, Nowa Sarzyna, Potok Górny, Rudnik nad Sanem and Ulanów.

References

Polish official population figures 2006

Krzeszow
Nisko County